The Old Hawg Rifle is the name of the rivalry trophy between the Eastern Kentucky Colonels and the Morehead State Eagles. The gun is an antique, pre-Revolutionary War muzzleloader that is rumored to have once been used in Kentucky's Rowan County War. The rifle has not been actively used in the rivalry since 1962, though the two teams have continued to play against each other since then. The rifle is currently kept on display in the Morehead State student center. The two teams have met 73 times on the football field, with Eastern Kentucky currently holding a 53–16–4 edge in the all-time series. Eastern Kentucky has won 28 out of the last 29 matchups.

Game results

See also
 List of NCAA college football rivalry games

References

College football rivalry trophies in the United States
Eastern Kentucky Colonels football
Morehead State Eagles football